Lake Superior and Ishpeming Railroad No. 18 is a preserved class SC-4 2-8-0 "Consolidation"-type steam locomotive. It was built by the American Locomotive Company in Pittsburgh, Pennsylvania, for the Lake Superior and Ishpeming Railroad in 1910 as engine No. 11. It was renumbered 18 in 1923. It was used for pulling carloads of iron ore, as well as some passenger trains on branch lines, until it was retired in 1962. In 1963, it was sold to Marquette and Mount Huron tourist railroad, but it never operated there. It was sold to the Lake States Steam Association in 1985, and it was stored at the Nicolet Badger Northern Railroad in Laona, Wisconsin. 

In 1989, it became the first locomotive to be restored and operated by the Grand Canyon Railway, and it pulled tourist excursions between Williams, Arizona and the Grand Canyon National Park, until 2002. In 2007, it was sold to the Mount Hood Tourist Railroad in Oregon to pull excursions there. Just a few months later, it was sold again to Rio Grande Scenic Railroad to pull more excursions between Alamosa and La Veta, Colorado until 2013. In 2021, No. 18 was purchased by the Maguire Foundation, and it was moved to Boyertown, Pennsylvania to be operated by the Colebrookdale Railroad Preservation Trust.

History

Original service life 
In the late 1900s, the Lake Superior and Ishpeming Railroad (LS&I) designed and ordered five small 2-8-0 Consolidation types from the American Locomotive Company (ALCO)’s Pittsburgh works in 1909, to replace their fleet of 1890s-built A3 class 0-6-0s, and they arrived the following year, being numbered 9–13. No. 18 was numbered 11 at the time and was the third member of the five that were built. The railroad designed these consolidations to pull heavy passenger and iron ore trains between West Ishpeming, Negaunee, and Marquette, Michigan, since the freight traffic was growing heavier for the railroad.

However, No. 11 and its classmates had smaller boilers than their predecessors, and they came with a few deisgn flaws that made them capable of less than 35,000 pounds of tractive effort. One of their design flaws was their fireboxes, which were very narrow, as they were tucked in between the rear set of driving wheels. This flaw made these consolidations poor steamers compared to their predecessors, including the 0-6-0s they were intended to replace. They had a bad habit of stalling on hills or giving up when their trains became heavy to pull, and railroaders often flew curses at them. No. 11 and its classmates instead saw use as motive power for mixed trains, stand-by locomotives when there was power needed for extra ore trains, or just use as dock switchers.

In 1923, the LS&I received some additional 2-8-0s, including some identical consolidations to No. 11 and its classmates, after purchasing the Munising, Marquette and Southeastern Railway (MM&SE), so a renumbering system and reclassification system subsequently took place, and Numbers 9–13 (and Numbers 38–40 from the MM&SE) were reclassified as SC-4s and renumbered 18–25. No. 11 was renumbered 18, taking its new road number from an SC-1 class.

With the railroad now having a proper facility in Presque Isle, between 1928 and 1934, No. 18 and all its classmates, with the exception of No. 25, were completely rebuilt to become more powerful and to get rid of all of their flaws; their boilers were raised, and they were rebuilt with larger fireboxes that sat above the driving wheels, instead of in between. Their boilers also became superheated, and Thermic siphons were installed inside their fireboxes. Their modifications have made their performances and efficiency vastly improve compared to how they did in their older saturated days. As the 1930s progressed, No. 18 was named after an engineer ‘Patrick McCarthy’, taking the name from 1907-built 2-8-0 No. 16. The SC-4s were reassigned to pull freight trains on the LS&I's branch mainline between West Ishpeming, Marquette, and Negaunee, during the ore seasons until the LS&I fully dieselized their locomotive fleet in the early 1960s. No. 18 was retired in 1962.

Early preservation 
The following year, the railroad sold eleven of their 2-8-0s, as well as some of their passenger cars, to the Marquette and Huron Mountain Tourist Railroad. This was intended to give the old consolidations another chance on life. However, No. 18 never pulled any excursion trains for the M&HM. Only some of its sister engines, Numbers 19, 22, and 23, were known to pull tourist trains there between Marquette and Big Bay. Instead, No. 18 sat with the rest of its sisters in the form of a 'scrapline', facing an uncertain future. The M&HM ran its last train before they ceased operations in 1984, when the railroad's owner and operator passed away.

In 1985, the 2-8-0s that remained in Marquette were sold back to the LS&I, who sold them all at an auction that same year to pay the M&HM's owner's overdue debts. Within a few months, No. 18 was bought and sold to various different owners, such as the North American Railroad dealership, and the Harvey Corporation. The locomotive was sold by the end of 1986 to the Lake States Steam Association, who moved it to the Nicolet Badger Northern Railroad (NBNR) in Laona, Wisconsin. They performed some boiler work on the locomotive with the hopes of restoring it to operating condition, but restoration work was never completed on the NBNR.

Grand Canyon Railway 
In 1988, the Grand Canyon Railway (GCRY), a former Atchison, Topeka and Santa Fe Railway line that lies between Williams, Arizona and the South Rim of the Grand Canyon National Park, was purchased by Max and Thelma Biegert, a couple from Flagstaff. They purchased No. 18, along with fellow LS&I 2-8-0s Numbers 19, 20, and SC-3 No. 29 for their operations. Numbers 19 and 20 were also being planned for operational restoration work for short-distance passenger service between the Williams depot and a four-mile branch linking from the GCRY's mainline and the nearby airport, but such plans were never implemented, due to cost.

No. 18 arrived in Williams on August 20, 1989 before restoration work would commence. During the process, No. 18 was given some modifications, including a centered headlight, a smokebox-mounted bell, and a conversion to burn oil. On September 17, after only twenty-eight days of restoration work, No. 18 was restored to operating condition, and that same day, the Grand Canyon line was re-inaugurated for public passenger service.

In April of the 1990, fellow LS&I locomotive, No. 29, was restored to operational status. Both locomotives would operate for the new railroad from Williams to the Grand Canyon Village and back. During the early years of GCRY operations, steam trains would run year-round with at least one month dedicated to maintenance.

In February 1991, No. 18 pulled a three-car special down the Santa Fe's Peavine line to Phoenix to take part in the "Union Station Days" to help promote rail awareness with the Arizona Rail Passenger Association. The locomotive stayed for three days before the event ended, and it subsequently returned to Williams.

In late 1989, the Grand Canyon Railway purchased ex-Chicago, Burlington and Quincy (CB&Q) 2-8-2 'Mikado' No. 4960. Rebuilding of this engine began in 1993 and ended in 1996, joining Numbers 18 and 29 as an operable stablemate and becoming the railway's flagship locomotive. In 1998, GCR began a six-year overhaul on No. 29, leaving Numbers 18 and 4960 to manage the steam-hauled trains.

No. 18 participated in the National Railway Historical Society's 2002 convention in August along with No. 4960 and guest engine Santa Fe 3751. Highlights of the event included the three engines in a rare tripledheader and night photoshoots. Once the convention was over, the 3751 returned home, and Numbers 18 and 4960 continued to be used in regular service.

Throughout the early 2000s the Grand Canyon Railway passenger trains were growing longer and exceeding the hauling capacity of No. 18. By January 2003, No. 18 was removed from revenue service, and placed on static display in front of the Williams Depot. In 2007, the GCRY acquired Ex-Spokane Portland and Seattle 2-8-2 No. 539 from Brian Fleming with the hopes of restoring it to operation. In exchange, the Fleming received both No. 18, and sister engine No. 20. The two consolidations were shipped on flatcars from Williams to Hood River, Oregon in June of that year. Shortly afterward, the Grand Canyon Railway company was purchased by Xanterra Travel Collection at an undisclosed cost, and restoration work on No. 539 never came to fruition.

Mount Hood Railroad 
In 2007, Fleming moved 18 and 20 to the Mount Hood Railroad (MHRR), in Hood River, Oregon. On the tourist line, passengers would get a good view Mount Hood. While the 20 was put on display still in GCRY livery, No. 18 was back under steam, and it was used to pull tourist trains between Hood River and Parkdale. Only one month after its return to steam, however, No. 18's time on the MHRR was already cut short. The railroad ceased steam operations, because they couldn't afford to keep steam locomotives operable or maintained.

Rio Grande Scenic Railroad 

In January 2008, Nos. 18 and 20 were shipped from Hood River South-bound to Alamosa, Colorado, after being sold again to Iowa Pacific Holdings, who decided to operate the former on one of their subsidiaries, the Rio Grande Scenic Railroad, a tourist railroad that operated on San Luis and Rio Grande trackage. The latter was sidelined, waiting for an operational restoration that never came. On May 3, 2008, No. 18 was test fired and was deemed a success, and afterwards, the little consolidation would pull either excursion trains or revenue freight trains on the SL&RG, mostly during the summer months, from Alamosa, crossing the Sangre de Christo Mountains West-bound to the town of La Veta. No. 18 would also sometimes handle trips from Alamosa South-bound to Antonito where passengers could connect with the narrow gauge Cumbres and Toltec Scenic Railroad.

On the RGSR, the little consolidation would find, yet, another steam powered running mate; Southern Pacific (SP) 1901-built 2-6-0 'Mogul' No. 1744, a locomotive that also returned to steam in 2007, but was taken out of service after only four months, as firebox repairs needed to be done. While in operation, No. 18 did be part of some occasional late or morning photoshoots either alone, or with the railroad's fp7 and f40ph diesel locomotives. No. 18 even occasionally operated during the freezing weather, just like how it often did so on the GCRY. In September 2012, No. 18 travelled westbound to Walsenburg for a night photo session alongside Union Pacific (UP) 4-8-4 "Northern" No. 844, which was in the course of pulling "UP 150" at the time. On September 1, 2013, No. 18 masqueraded as San Luis Central No. 1 to commemorate the centennial of San Luis Central Railroad.

As the 2010s progressed, however, the RGSR was starting to run into some financial trouble, and much like the MHRR, the Colorado scenic railroad could no longer afford to operate steam locomotives. No. 18 made its last run on the SL&RG by pulling an excursion trip on September 21, 2013. After that, it was placed in storage inside the SL&RG locomotive shops. One of the final straws to the RGSR's struggle was a wildfire that badly damaged the Fir Concert Grounds. The railroad ceased all tourist train operations as they declared bankruptcy and shut down in late 2019, and the SL&RG began liquidating their liquidation process.

Colebrookdale Railroad 
No. 18 would stored out of the weather inside the SL&RG's locomotive shops in Alamosa. No. 20 was purchased by the City of Allen, Texas, and it was shipped to Allen to be put on static display, much like No. 19 in Frisco. In late March 2021, No. 18 was purchased for an undisclosed amount by the Maguire Foundation, who has the intent of leasing the locomotive to the Colebrookdale Railroad, a former Reading Railroad branch line that ran between Boyertown and Pottstown, Pennsylvania. On June 22, No. 18's boiler and frame were separated and were prepped along with its tender to be shipped by truck to Boyertown. On the evening of June 29, No. 18 arrived in Boyertown safely, and it touched Pennsylvania soil for the first time since it was built in Pittsburgh back in 1910. It was subsequently moved by EMD GP38-2 No. 5128 inside a newly built facility near Pottstown for an overhaul that began in the fall. The locomotive is expected to run again with no current planned return date.

See also 

Lake Superior and Ishpeming 33
Duluth and Northern Minnesota 14
Southern Pacific 2353
Union Pacific 618
Grand Trunk Western 4070
Great Smoky Mountains Railroad 1702

References

External links 
 Grand Canyon Railway Official Website
 Colebrookdale Railroad Website

2-8-0 locomotives
Railway locomotives introduced in 1910
Standard gauge locomotives of the United States
Individual locomotives of the United States
Freight locomotives
Standard gauge steam locomotives
Lake Superior and Ishpeming locomotives
Preserved steam locomotives of Pennsylvania